Renfro Mill, also known as R. Roberts Leaf Tobacco House, is a historic industrial building located at Mount Airy, Surry County, North Carolina. The original section was built as a tobacco barn about 1893. The largest addition was built in 1946–1947. It is a one- to 4 1/2-story, brick, concrete, steel, wood, and granite industrial building encompassing 100,000 square feet of space.  It was originally built to house a tobacco leaf house, and after 1921 the Renfro company, a sock manufacturer.  The mill closed in 1997.

It was listed on the National Register of Historic Places in 2000.

References

Industrial buildings and structures on the National Register of Historic Places in North Carolina
Victorian architecture in North Carolina
Industrial buildings completed in 1893
Buildings and structures in Surry County, North Carolina
National Register of Historic Places in Surry County, North Carolina
Textile mills in North Carolina
1893 establishments in North Carolina
Mount Airy, North Carolina